Altenum was a fort in the Roman province of Scythia Minor in the 4th and 6th centuries AD.

See also
List of castra

External links
Roman castra from Romania - Google Maps / Earth

Notes

Roman Dacia
Archaeological sites in Romania
Roman legionary fortresses in Romania
History of Dobruja
Historic monuments in Constanța County